A decorative or ornamental knot (also fancy knot) is an often complex knot exhibiting repeating patterns. A decorative knot is generally a knot that not only has practical use but is also known for its aesthetic or ornamental qualities. Often originating from maritime use, "decorative knots are not only serviceable and functional but also enhance the ship-shape appearance of any vessel." Decorative knots may be used alone or in combination, and may consist of single or multiple strands.

Coxcombing is decorative knotwork performed by sailors during the Age of Sail to dress-up, protect, or help identify specific items and parts of ships and boats.

List

This is an alphabetical list of decorative knots.

See also

References

External links

Coxcombing:
http://www.frayedknotarts.com/wheel.html
http://www.morethanknots.com/Hitching_files/Hitch_1.html

Arts-related lists